The 1st Manchurian Army was a field army of the Russian Empire that was established in 1904 during  the Russo-Japanese War, for the purposes of operating in the Manchuria region against Japan. It was one of the three such armies that were created and was involved in every major engagement.

History
It was formed in October–November 1904, from the basis of the Manchurian Army that had existed until September of that year, which had been dissolved after the Battle of Liaoyang. The previous "Manchurian Army" was a term that encompassed all units of the Russian Imperial Army formations operating in the region against the Imperial Japanese Army. It consisted of the following formations: 1st Siberian Army Corps primarily as the southern detachment and the 3rd Siberian Army Corps primarily as the eastern. In September 1904, that army was officially disbanded by order of Emperor Nicholas II and replaced by the 1st, 2nd, and 3rd Manchurian Armies.

Order of battle
The 1st Manchurian Army consisted of the following units, as of January 1905.
1st Army Corps
22nd Infantry Division
37th Infantry Division
2nd Siberian Army Corps
6th Siberian Rifle Division
8th Siberian Rifle Division
3rd Siberian Army Corps
4th Siberian Rifle Division
7th Siberian Rifle Division
4th Siberian Army Corps
2nd Siberian Rifle Division
3rd Siberian Rifle Division

Commanders
The formation was commanded by the following officers until its dissolution.

Chief of Staff
 28.10.1904-17.03.1905 : Lieutenant-General V. I. Kharkevich.
 24.03.1905-18.04.1906 : Lieutenant General Aleksei Evert.

References

Notes

Books

1904 establishments in the Russian Empire
Armies of the Russian Empire
Military units and formations established in 1904
Military units and formations disestablished in 1906